Kalateh-ye Archinabad (also Romanized as Kalāteh-ye Ārchīnābād; also known as Ārchīnābād and Archīnābād) is a village in Sudlaneh Rural District, in the Central District of Quchan County, Razavi Khorasan Province, Iran. At the 2006 census, its population was 21, in 5 families.

References 

Populated places in Quchan County